Search query may refer to:

 Database query
 Web search query

See also 
 Search engine (computing)